Alex Kuznetsov was the defending champion but decided not to participate.

Sergiy Stakhovsky won the title, defeating Wayne Odesnik 6–4, 7–6(11–9) in the final.

Seeds

Draw

Finals

Top half

Bottom half

References
 Main Draw
 Qualifying Draw

Levene Gouldin and Thompson Tennis Challenger - Singles
2014 Singles
2014 Levene Gouldin & Thompson Tennis Challenger